Tobias Verwey (born 2 November 1981) is a Namibian cricketer. He is a right-handed batsman and a wicket-keeper. He has played first-class cricket with the Namibian cricket team since 2005, having represented the team in 12 Youth One Day Internationals between 2000 and 2002.

He played for Namibia's Under-19 World Cup squads of 2000 and 2002 before stepping up to the first-team squad. He has since played in the respective tours to Namibia of the Pakistani and Bermudan teams.

In December 2006, Verwey scored his first century for the Namibian team, against the United Arab Emirates.

External links
Tobias Verwey at Cricket Archive 

1981 births
Living people
People from Ermelo, Mpumalanga
Namibian cricketers